The Northern Pacific Railway Museum is a railroad museum in Toppenish, Washington. It is located on 10 Asotin Av. and open between May and December.

In 1990 the ex-Northern Pacific Railway depot in Toppenish, WA, was leased and subsequently purchased from the Burlington Northern Railroad in 1993 for the museum.

In 1993 the 1902 Northern Pacific steam locomotive #1364 was leased, and restoration began. Currently the 1364 is being hydro-tested and upon passing at 200psi it will be fully steamed and certified under the FRA.  Present goal is to be operational by Christmas 2018.  In 2017 the Northern Pacific Railway Museum fully purchased the 1364 from the City of Tacoma and own a clear title to the engine.

External links
Museum's website

Railroad museums in Washington (state)
Heritage railroads in Washington (state)
Toppenish
Museums in Yakima County, Washington